Blue Ridge Community College is a community college located in Weyers Cave, Virginia in Augusta County. The campus is located between Interstate 81 and U.S. Route 11 just outside Weyers Cave. The school is a part of the Virginia Community College System and serves students from the cities of Harrisonburg, Staunton, and Waynesboro, Virginia, and the counties of Augusta, Highland and Rockingham. Blue Ridge also has a satellite location at Augusta Health in Fishersville, Virginia.

Alumni 

 Donald DePoy, born August 10, 1949, fifth-generation bluegrass musician, music educator, and music event organizer.
 Dr. Gregory Hargreaves, born December 1984, historian of capitalism, environment, and technology.

References

External links
Official website

Virginia Community College System
Education in Augusta County, Virginia
Educational institutions established in 1967
Universities and colleges accredited by the Southern Association of Colleges and Schools
Buildings and structures in Augusta County, Virginia
1967 establishments in Virginia